Sun Li (born 26 September 1982), also known as Susan Sun, is a Chinese actress. In 2018, she became the youngest Chinese actress to win the "Grand Slam", after winning the three biggest television awards, the Flying Apsaras Awards, Golden Eagle Awards and the Magnolia Awards.

Career
Sun first entered show business by participating in 2001's Star Search, held by Singapore's MediaCorp. She reached the finals and earned the praise of judge Andy Lau. Following the competition, Sun joined Hairun Media as their first flagship artist.

In 2003, author and TV producer Hai Yan selected her for the female lead in the television series Goddess of Mercy. Sun received overwhelmingly positive feedback from audiences for her portrayal of An Xin, and rose to fame in China as one of the most promising young actresses.

In 2006, Sun won the Best Newcomer award at the 28th Hundred Flowers Awards for her performance in Huo Yuanjia co-starring Jet Li. She then starred alongside Huang Xiaoming in Shanghai Bund (2007), a mainland remake of the 1980 television series The Bund.

Sun starred in Gordon Chan's horror-adventure film Painted Skin (2008), and was nominated for the Best Supporting Actress award for her performance as a young and inexperienced demon hunter at numerous award ceremonies. The same year, she starred in Gao Xixi's military-romance drama Tian Mi Mi. The series was chosen by the Chinese Radio & Television Association as one of the Top Ten television series of the year.

Sun then starred in Iron Road (2009), the second joint venture created under Canada/China co-production treaty established in the 1960s. She plays a poor Chinese girl in search of her father who works at a railroad in North America, and challenged speaking in English for the film. For her performance, Sun was  
crowned Best Actress at the 2nd Roma FictionFest and the 25th Gemini Awards. The same year, Sun played the title character in the television series, Auntie Duohe, based on the novel of the same name by acclaimed writer Geling Yan.

Sun gained widespread recognition by playing Zhen Huan in the critically acclaimed historical drama, Empresses in the Palace. She was nominated for an International Emmy Award in the Best Actress category for her role. Praised for being one of the best historical dramas in China, the series garnered high ratings throughout its run and also sparked trends in dialogue quotes and plastic surgery. The same year, she reunited with Painted Skin director Gordan Chan in Mural (also known as Painted Skin 2). She also starred in martial arts film The Lost Bladesman alongside Donnie Yen and Jiang Wen.

For her role as an independent mother in Hot Mom! (2013), Sun won the Best Actress award at the 20th Shanghai Television Festival. She also won the Most Popular Actress award at the 10th China Golden Eagle TV Arts Festival.

In 2015, Sun played Queen Dowager Xuan, the first stateswoman in China, in historical drama The Legend of Mi Yue. The series was a commercial success, and recorded the highest ratings of the year. Sun won her second Best Actress trophy at the 22nd Shanghai Television Festival. The same year, Sun challenged her first comedy role in Devil and Angel, directed by her husband Deng Chao.

In 2017, Sun played the lead character in the period drama Nothing Gold Can Stay, based on a real-life story of Zhou Ying, a budding businesswoman who takes on the responsibilities from her dead husband and starts rebuilding their business empire from scratch. For her performance in the role, Sun was awarded the Outstanding Actress award at the Flying Apsaras Awards.

In 2018, Sun starred in Zhang Yimou's historical film, Shadow as the female lead. She was nominated in the Best Actress category at the Golden Horse Awards for her performance.

In 2019, Sun was cast in the drama I Will Find You a Better Home''  as a star property agent, and was nominated for the Best Actress award at the Shanghai Television Festival.

Personal life
Sun and actor Deng Chao registered their marriage in 2010 and held an official wedding ceremony in 2011 when she was five months pregnant. They have two children, a son named Deng Han Zhi (born in November 2011) and a daughter named Deng Han Yi (born in May 2014).

She has a half sister, Sun Yan, who is also an actress. Her sister is 19 years younger than Sun Li.

Filmography

Film

Television series

Discography

Albums

Singles

Awards and nominations

Forbes China Celebrity 100

Notes

References

External links

 

1982 births
Living people
Chinese film actresses
Chinese television actresses
Chinese women television presenters
Chinese television presenters
Chinese broadcasters
Actresses from Shanghai
21st-century Chinese actresses